Federal Medical Centre, Asaba is a federal government of Nigeria medical centre located in Asaba, Delta State, Nigeria. The current chief medical director is Osiatuma Azubuike.

History 
Federal Medical Centre, Asaba was established in August, 1998. The hospital was formerly known as General Hospital, Asaba.

CMD 
The current chief medical director is Osiatuma Azubuike.

References 

Hospitals in Nigeria